Ascoli Piceno railway station serves the town and comune of Ascoli Piceno, in the region of Marche, central Italy.  Opened in 1886, it is the southwestern terminus of the San Benedetto del Tronto–Ascoli Piceno railway, a branch of the Adriatic railway.

The station is managed by Rete Ferroviaria Italiana (RFI).  The commercial area of the passenger building is managed by Centostazioni.  Train services are operated by Trenitalia.  Each of these companies is a subsidiary of Ferrovie dello Stato (FS), Italy's state-owned rail company.

Location
Ascoli Piceno railway station is situated at Piazza della Stazione, to the east of the town centre.

History
The station was opened on 1 May 1886, together with the rest of the San Benedetto del Tronto–Ascoli Piceno railway.

The original operator of the station was the Società per le Strade Ferrate Meridionali (SFM), which operated the whole of the Ascoli Piceno branch as part of the Rete Adriatica.  The SFM continued to operate the branch until the nationalization of the Italian railways in 1905.

Features

Passenger Building
Ascoli Piceno's passenger building is a two-storey structure, comprising three sections.  It is made of brick and painted brown.

The central section of the building has six mullioned windows topped by arches, and its first floor windows are decorated with cornices.  The ground floor of that section houses services for passengers, but the first floor is not accessible to the public.

Extending laterally from the central section are two symmetrical single-storey wings.

Station yard
The station yard consists of three tracks dedicated to passenger transport. In detail:
Track 1: is a siding track.
Track 2: lines up directly with the running track.
Track 3: is another siding track.

The tracks are all passing tracks, because although the station is the terminal, each track ends about  outside the station.  All tracks have a platform, and are connected by a concrete walkway. Only one track is covered by a canopy, which is made of wrought iron.

The station yard is also equipped with a group of sidings dedicated to the storage of vehicles not in service.  These sidings are connected with the platforms by a bridge.  There is a locomotive shed, and a goods shed of a design typical to Italian railway stations. The former goods yard has been dismantled, and the goods shed is disused.

From the station yard, a number of spur lines extend to nearby industrial sidings.  Some of these spur lines are made partially of tramway tracks, at points where the line previously intersected with asphalt covered roadway.

Train movements

Only regional trains stop at the station.  Their main origins and destinations are San Benedetto del Tronto, Civitanova Marche and Ancona.

Interchange
In the square in front of the passenger building is a bus terminal for urban and suburban buses.  The operator of the bus service is START.

See also

History of rail transport in Italy
List of railway stations in the Marche
Rail transport in Italy
Railway stations in Italy

References

External links
Description and pictures of the station by the group Fermodellistico Pescara 

This article is based upon a translation of the Italian language version as at January 2011.

Buildings and structures in Ascoli Piceno
Railway stations in the Marche
Railway stations opened in 1886